Highway 361 (AR 361, Ark. 361, and Hwy. 361) is a designation for two north–south state highways in the Arkansas Delta region of eastern Arkansas. One segment of  runs east from Highway 25 at Saffell to Highway 25 in Lynn. A second route of  begins at Highway 117 in Black Rock and runs north to Highway 166 at Old Davidsonville State Park. Both routes are maintained by the Arkansas State Highway and Transportation Department (AHTD).

Route description

Saffell to Lynn
Highway 361 begins at Highway 25 at Saffell in southwestern Lawrence County. The route runs east before turning north and crossing the Strawberry River. Following the crossing, Highway 361 curves north and passes through agricultural areas before intersecting Highway 25 in Lynn, where it terminates.

Black Rock to Davidsonville Historic State Park

Highway 361 begins at Highway 117 (Elm St) in Black Rock. The highway runs north to cross the Spring River on the Lawrence/Randolph county line and enter Randolph County. Continuing north, Highway 361 enters Davidsonville Historic State Park, where the route terminates. The roadway continues north as Highway 166.

History
The highway segment between Saffell and Lynn was added to the state highway system by the Arkansas State Highway Commission on November 23, 1966. A second segment from Black Rock to the Spring River was added to the system on April 24, 1973. The highway was extended north to the state park on May 6, 1987.

Major intersections

|-
| colspan= 5 align=center | Highway 361 begins in Black Rock

See also

References

361
Transportation in Lawrence County, Arkansas
Transportation in Randolph County, Arkansas